This is a list of towns and cities in Malawi:

Northern Region

 Chitipa
 Chilumba
 Ekwendeni
 Karonga
 Likoma
 Livingstonia
 Mzimba
 Mzuzu
 Nkhata Bay
 Rumphi
 Chintheche
 Embangweni

Central Region

 Aaron
 Chipoka
 Dedza
 Dowa
 Kasungu
 Lilongwe
 Mchinji
 Mponela
 Mua
 Namitete 
 Madisi
 Nkhotakota
 Nkhoma
 Ntcheu
 Ntchisi
 Salima

Southern Region

 Balaka
 Bangula
 Blantyre
 Chikwawa
 Chiradzulu
 Chiwembe
 Domasi
 Limbe
 Liwonde
 Luchenza
 Machinga
 Malosa
 Mangochi
 Marka
 Monkey Bay
 Mulanje
 Njata
 Nkaya
 Nsanje
 Phalombe
 Thyolo
 Zalewa
 Zomba

See also
 List of cities in East Africa

Malawi, List of cities in
 
Malawi
Cities